The ursine howler (Alouatta arctoidea) is a species of howler monkey native to Venezuela and possibly Colombia.  It is sometimes considered a subspecies of the Venezuelan red howler and classified as Alouatta seniculus arctoidea.

References

ursine howler
Mammals of Venezuela
ursine howler
Taxa named by Ángel Cabrera (naturalist)